Jan Syrový (24 January 1888 – 17 October 1970) was a Czechoslovak general who was the prime minister of Czechoslovakia during the Munich Crisis.

Early life and military career
Jan Syrový studied building at a technical school. Following his graduation in 1906, he became a one-year volunteer in the Austro-Hungarian army. After that, he studied at a technical college in Russia. During World War I, he fought in the Czechoslovak Legions of the Russian Army and lost his right eye at the Battle of Zborov.

By the end of the war, he commanded the Legions and the anti-Bolshevik forces on the Trans-Siberian railway. A well-known veteran commander, he served as Chief of Staff of the Czechoslovak Army from 1926 to 1933 and as its general inspector from 1933 to 1938. He helped to prepare the Czechoslovak Air Force with the help of Jan Antonín Baťa and moved military personnel and materials away from Nazi Germany.

Munich Crisis
When Milan Hodža's government resigned on 23 September 1938, President Edvard Beneš appointed Syrový to head a national unity government. Syrový demurred at first by insisting that he was just a soldier, not a politician, and that he lacked the qualifications and the relevant experience for such an important post. Beneš told Syrový that the nation needed him and added that as a soldier, Syrový should consider it as not an offer but an order. With some reluctance, Syrový then accepted and took the defence portfolio as well.

As Prime Minister, he was forced to accept the terms of the Munich Agreement on 30 September. Announcing the acceptance of the agreement in a nationwide radio address, he stated that Czechoslovakia was not in a position to turn the agreement down because without British or French support, the country was outnumbered and any conflict would result in severe casualties. "We were abandoned", he said. "We stand alone".

After the resignation of Beneš on 5 October, Syrový assumed most presidential duties, in accord with the Czechoslovak Constitution until Emil Hácha was duly elected President on 30 November 1938.

He resigned the premiership on 1 December 1938 and remained as Minister of National Defence until 27 April 1939. He did not join the anti-German resistance since he was too well-known a figure for his involvement to be anything other than a liability. However, he arranged the transfer of substantial sums from a Legionary relief fund to assist the resistance and the people facing persecution.

Later life 
On 14 May 1945, in the immediate aftermath of the war, Syrový was arrested and charged with collaboration although he had consciously steered clear of that as far as his office allowed. In a show trial of alleged collaborators in 1947, the National Court found him guilty, along with Rudolf Beran, and sentenced him to 20 years of imprisonment in severe conditions.

Released in 1960 by Antonín Novotný's amnesty, Syrový was left with no pension or any means of maintenance, and the communist regime barred him from employment. Eventually, he was allowed to work as a nightwatchman, guarding Luděk Marold's panorama of the Battle of Lipany. Not until late 1967 would the regime grant him a limited retirement pension.

Syrový was deeply wounded by the verdict of the National Court and remained so for the rest of his life. His own conscience was clear, and he never came to terms with the apparent injustice of the decision. He reviewed his trial in an interview for the Report Magazine in 1968 and stated that there were three critical pieces of evidence laid against him. The first was a snapshot of himself shaking hands with Adolf Hitler during a meeting that he was obliged to attend at the Prague Castle. Hitler had made a speech of reassurance as to Czechoslovakia's future under the 'protection' of the Reich and then held out his hand to Syrový, and the photographers immediately took a picture.

Another photograph provided the second piece of evidence , which was taken at a government banquet that showed Syrový sitting alongside Konrad Henlein. Syrový stated that the picture was taken out of context, to be used for Nazi propaganda.

The third piece of critical evidence was an arms contract with the Nazis. Syrový stated the weapons sold had been obsolete items from the First World War, which were no longer of any use to Czechoslovakia, and that the weapons had been sold to German private companies. He also stated that the decision to sell was made ultimately not by him alone but by the government as a whole. Syrový felt that if the Czechoslovak allies had offered their promised help, he would never have had to accept the Munich Agreement, but under the circumstances, the Czechoslovak Army had no chance of success on its own.

Syrový died on 17 October 1970.

Decorations
Awarded by Belgium:
 Order of the Crown, in the grade of: Grand Officer
 Croix de Guerre 1914-18

Awarded by Czechoslovakia:
 Czechoslovak War Cross 1918: with four linden branches 
 Order of the Falcon: with swords 
 Czechoslovak Revolutionary Medal 1914-18 with clasps: "Č.D.", "Zborov" and numbers "1", "2" 
 Czechoslovak Medal of Victory 1918 

Awarded by Estonia:
 Military Order of the Cross of the Eagle, for the Protection of the Country: I. class 

Awarded by France:
 Légion d'honneur, in the grade of: Grand Officier 
Légion d'honneur, in the grade of: Commandeur 
Légion d'honneur, in the grade of: Officier 
Légion d'honneur, in the grade of: Chevalier [Knight] 
 Croix de Guerre 1914-18: with palme 

Awarded by Italy:
 Order of the Italian Crown: II. class 
 War Merit Cross

Awarded by Japan:
 Order of the Sacred Treasure: II. class 

Awarded by Yugoslavia:
 Order of St. Sava: I. class 
 Order of the White Eagle: I. class 
Order of the White Eagle: II. class 
 Order of the Karađorđe's Star with Swords : II. class 

Awarded by Lithuania:
 Order of Vytis Cross: Cross, II. class 

Awarded by Latvia:
 Order of Lāčplēsis: II. class 
 Order of the Three Stars: II. class 

Awarded by Morocco:
 Nischan el Quissam Alaouite: I. class 

Awarded by Poland:
 Order of Polonia Restituta: II. class 

Awarded by Romania:
 Order of the Star of Romania: I. class 
 Order of the Crown:  II. class 
 Order of Loyal Service: I. class 
 Remembrance Cross 1916-19: with the clasp: "Siberia" 

Awarded by Imperial Russia:
 Order of St. Vladimir: IV. class 
 Order of St. Anne: IV. class 
 Order of Saint Stanislaus (Imperial House of Romanov): III. class 
 Cross of St. George: IV. class 

Awarded by Greece:
 Order of the Phoenix: I. class 
 Medal of Military Merit

Awarded by Tunisia:
 Order of Nischan el Iftikchar: I. class 

Awarded by Great Britain:
 Order of the Bath, in the grade of: Knight Commander [KCB]

See also
 Occupation of Czechoslovakia
 List of prime ministers of Czechoslovakia

External links
  Short biography

References

1888 births
1970 deaths
Politicians from Třebíč
People from the Margraviate of Moravia
Prime Ministers of Czechoslovakia
Czechoslovak soldiers
Czech generals
Chiefs of the General Staff (Czechoslovakia)
People of the Russian Civil War
Czechoslovak Legion
Czechoslovak military personnel of World War I
Austro-Hungarian military personnel of World War I
Recipients of the Order of Saint Stanislaus (Russian), 3rd class
Recipients of the Croix de guerre (Belgium)
Recipients of the Czechoslovak War Cross
Knights of the Order of the Falcon (Czechoslovakia)
Recipients of the Military Order of the Cross of the Eagle, Class I
Grand Officiers of the Légion d'honneur
Recipients of the Croix de Guerre 1914–1918 (France)
Recipients of the War Merit Cross (Italy)
Recipients of the Order of the Sacred Treasure, 2nd class
Grand Crosses of the Order of St. Sava
Recipients of the Order of Vytautas the Great
Commanders with Star of the Order of Polonia Restituta
Grand Crosses of the Order of the Star of Romania
Grand Officers of the Order of the Crown (Romania)
Recipients of the Order of St. Vladimir, 4th class
Recipients of the Order of St. Anna, 4th class
Recipients of the Cross of St. George
Grand Crosses of the Order of the Phoenix (Greece)
Recipients of the Medal of Military Merit (Greece)
Grand Officers of the Order of the Crown (Belgium)
Recipients of the Order of Lāčplēsis, 2nd class
Honorary Knights Commander of the Order of the Bath
Recipients of the Order of the Cross of Vytis
Burials at Olšany Cemetery